Deepak Dhawan was the State Committee member of the Communist Party of India (Marxist) (CPI(M)) representing Punjab and also Joint Secretary of Khet Mazdoor Union, a mass organisation of CPI(M), which campaigns for the rights of landless agricultural labourers. He was a member of All India Students Federation (AISF) in D.A.V College, Amritsar, and an elected President of Student Council (Progressive Student Front - a united front of SFI and AISF) at Guru Nanak Dev University. On 19 May 1987, he was killed by Khalistan movement extremists at Sangha village, Tarn Taran district.

Commemoration 

On 19 June 2020, on the 33rd anniversary of his death, the Revolutionary Marxist Party of India launched a calendar to commemorate Dhawan and highlight the principles of socialism by which he lived and sacrificed his life.

References

1987 deaths
Communist Party of India (Marxist) politicians from Punjab, India
Place of birth missing
1955 births
Victims of Sikh terrorism